Angelina Myers Martino (born April 25, 1967), now known as Angel Sims, is an American former competition swimmer, three-time Olympic champion, and former world record-holder.  Over her career, she won three Olympic gold medals and three bronze medals.

In 2001 she was inducted into the Georgia Sports Hall of Fame.

See also

 List of multiple Olympic gold medalists
 List of Olympic medalists in swimming (women)
 List of World Aquatics Championships medalists in swimming (women)
 World record progression 100 metres backstroke
 World record progression 4 × 100 metres freestyle relay

References

1967 births
Living people
American female backstroke swimmers
American female butterfly swimmers
American female freestyle swimmers
World record setters in swimming
Furman University alumni
Olympic gold medalists for the United States in swimming
Olympic bronze medalists for the United States in swimming
Pan American Games gold medalists for the United States
Swimmers at the 1995 Pan American Games
People from Americus, Georgia
Sportspeople from Tuscaloosa, Alabama
Swimmers at the 1992 Summer Olympics
Swimmers at the 1996 Summer Olympics
World Aquatics Championships medalists in swimming
Medalists at the FINA World Swimming Championships (25 m)
Medalists at the 1996 Summer Olympics
Medalists at the 1992 Summer Olympics
Pan American Games medalists in swimming
Medalists at the 1995 Pan American Games
21st-century American women